Harold Robert Aaron (June 21, 1921 – April 30, 1980) was a lieutenant general in the United States Army.

Biography
Born in Kokomo, Indiana, Aaron attended Morton High School in Richmond, Indiana, graduating in 1938. He then studied at Earlham College for two years before entering the United States Military Academy at West Point in 1940. Aaron graduated with a B.S. degree in June 1943 and served in Europe during World War II, earning two Bronze Stars and a Purple Heart. He later graduated from the Command and General Staff College in 1953, the Armed Forces Staff College in 1958 and the National War College in 1964. Aaron completed an M.A. degree in international relations at Georgetown University in January 1960. He went on to earn a Ph.D. in international relations at Georgetown in 1964. His doctoral thesis was entitled The seizure of political power in Cuba, 1956-1959.

As a colonel, Aaron served as Commander, 5th Special Forces Group (Airborne) in Vietnam from June 4, 1968, to May 29, 1969, earning a third Bronze Star and two Air Medals. From November 5, 1973, to August 28, 1977, he served as the Assistant Chief of Staff for Intelligence, Headquarters, Department of the Army as a major general. Aaron was later promoted to lieutenant general. He retired from active duty on January 31, 1979 after serving as deputy director of the Defense Intelligence Agency.

Aaron married Marianne H. O'Donoghue on January 16, 1944 at St. Patrick's Cathedral in New York City. They had three sons and four daughters. After his retirement from the Army, Aaron and his wife lived in Annandale, Virginia.

Aaron died in DeWitt Army Hospital at Fort Belvoir after suffering a heart attack. He was buried at Arlington National Cemetery in Arlington, Virginia.

Honors and awards
General Aaron is a member of the Military Intelligence Hall of Fame.
   Army Distinguished Service Medal
   Legion of Merit with two oak leaf clusters
   Bronze Star with two oak leaf clusters
   Purple Heart
   Air Medal with oak leaf cluster

References

External links
 Harold Robert Aaron at ArlingtonCemetery.net, an unofficial website

1921 births
1980 deaths
People from Kokomo, Indiana
Earlham College alumni
United States Military Academy alumni
Military personnel from Indiana
United States Army personnel of World War II
United States Army Command and General Staff College alumni
Joint Forces Staff College alumni
Georgetown University alumni
National War College alumni
Recipients of the Legion of Merit
United States Army personnel of the Vietnam War
Recipients of the Air Medal
United States Army generals
Recipients of the Distinguished Service Medal (US Army)
People from Annandale, Virginia
Burials at Arlington National Cemetery